The Teluk Semangka class is a class of tank landing ships operated by the Indonesian Navy. The ships were built by the Korea-Tacoma Shipyard (now Hanjin Heavy Industries), Masan, South Korea in the early 1980s.

Design 
The ships is powered by two diesel engines, with total sustained power output of  distributed in two shaft.

Teluk Semangka class has a capacity of 200 troops,  of cargo (which includes 17 main battle tanks), and 2 (4 for Teluk Semangka and Teluk Mandar) LCVPs on davits. The ships has a complement of 90 personnel, including 13 officers. Two last ships of the class, Teluk Ende and Teluk Banten, are command ships and has distinguishing features such as the LCVP davits located forward of the bridge and the exhaust vents above the waterlines instead of funnels found on the other ships.

The ships are armed with three single Bofors 40 mm L/70 guns, two single Rheinmettal 20 mm autocannons, and two single DShK 12.7 mm heavy machine guns. The command variant has same weaponry with one less 40 mm gun.

It was noted that Teluk Ende was outfitted as a hospital ship but later was reverted back to landing ship and the Red Cross markings were removed.

The ships has helicopter decks in the amidships and aft for small to medium helicopter such as Westland Wasp or MBB Bo 105, with the command variants having hangar facility and helicopter deck in the aft with provisions for up to 3 Eurocopter AS332 Super Puma helicopters.

Ships in the class

See also
Landing Ship, Tank
Go Jun Bong-class LST
Teluk Bintuni-class tank landing ship

References

Bibliography
 
 

Ships built by Hanjin Heavy Industries
Amphibious warfare vessels of the Indonesian Navy
 
Tank landing ships